The Gymnesians, or Gymnesic Islands, is a collective name given to the two largest (and easternmost) Balearic Islands, Mallorca and Menorca, distinguishing them from the Pityuses, or Pine Islands, Ibiza and Formentera.

Etymology 
The word Gymnesian (from the  ) means "naked". The Greeks called the islands Gymnesiae. According to Diodorus Siculus the Greeks called the islands like this because the inhabitants were naked during the summer time. The Ancient Greeks recruited the local inhabitants of these islands, the Talaiotics, as slingers. According to some researchers, this does not mean that they fought naked, but that they used much lighter armament than the hoplites.

Name usage 
Later the Phoenicians referred to both Mallorca and Menorca as the Baliarides. After the whole archipelago (the Pityuses and Gymnesians) came under Roman rule, the islands gained the overall Latin name Insulae Baliares or Baleares Insulae; the collective concept has continued in use in modern languages, hence ultimately the English name "Balearic Islands".

References 

 Strabo Geography Book III, Chapter 2
 Belenguer, E. Història de les illes Balears. Barcelona: Edicions 62, 2004. 525 p.  (volume I)

Islands of the Balearic Islands